Quelneuc is a former commune in the Morbihan department of Brittany in north-western France. On 1 January 2017, it was merged into the commune Carentoir.

Demographics
Inhabitants of Quelneuc are called in French Quelneucois.

See also
Communes of the Morbihan department

References

External links

Official website 

Former communes of Morbihan